The Turgeon River is a river flowing through the municipality of the United Townships of Stoneham-et-Tewkesbury, located north of the Quebec (city) , in the La Jacques-Cartier Regional County Municipality, in the administrative region of Capitale-Nationale, in the province from Quebec, to Canada.

The upper part of the Turgeon River valley is served by secondary forest roads.

The surface of the Turgeon River (except the rapids areas) is generally frozen from the beginning of December to the end of March; however, safe circulation on the ice is generally done from the end of December to the beginning of March. The water level of the river varies with the seasons and the precipitation; the spring flood occurs in March or April.

Geography 
The Turgeon River rises at the mouth of Demers Lake located in a forest and mountain area. This small lake has a small marsh area in the northern part. The mouth of this lake is located at:
  north-east of the confluence of the Turgeon and Hurons rivers;
  north-east of the center of the village of Saint-Adolphe;
  north-west of the village center of Sainte-Brigitte-de-Laval;
  north-east of the center of the village of Stoneham.

  towards the southwest by forming a curve towards the east, then crossing Lake Turgeon to its mouth. Note: this small lake has a marsh area on the east side;
  south-west passing on the south side of a mountain reaching  and collecting a stream (coming from the south-east and being the outlet of 'a small unidentified lake), up to a bend in the river, corresponding to an intermittent stream (coming from the south-east);
  north-west with a steep drop, to its confluence with the rivière des Hurons.

Toponymy 
The toponym "Rivière Turgeon" was formalized on August 2, 1974, at the Commission de toponymie du Québec.

See also 

 St. Lawrence River
 List of rivers of Quebec

References 

 Brodeur, C., F. Lewis, E. Huet-Alegre, Y. Ksouri, M.-C. Leclerc and D. Viens. 2007. Portrait of the Saint-Charles river basin. Saint-Charles river basin council. 216 p + 9 annexes 217-340 pp

Rivers of Capitale-Nationale
La Jacques-Cartier Regional County Municipality